Ryu Shikun (柳時熏, born December 8, 1971 in Seoul, South Korea) is a professional Go player.

Biography 
Ryu Shikun is a Go player who grew up in Seoul. He did not move to Japan until he was 15, and just 2 years later he turned professional. He was promoted to 9 dan in 2003.

Titles & runners-up

See also
Go players

External links
GoBase Profile
Nihon Ki-in Profile (Japanese)

1971 births
Living people
South Korean Go players